Rolf Jobst (born 31 March 1951 in Ebersbach, East Germany) is a German rower, who competed for the SC Dynamo Berlin / Sportvereinigung (SV) Dynamo. He won the medals at the international rowing competitions.

References

External links
 

1951 births
Living people
People from Ebersbach-Neugersdorf
East German male rowers
Sportspeople from Saxony
Olympic rowers of East Germany
Rowers at the 1972 Summer Olympics
Olympic medalists in rowing
Medalists at the 1972 Summer Olympics
Olympic silver medalists for East Germany
World Rowing Championships medalists for East Germany
Recipients of the Patriotic Order of Merit in bronze
European Rowing Championships medalists